Komi-Permyak Autonomous Okrug was an autonomous okrug of Russia, administered by Perm Oblast. It was established on February 26, 1925 as an administrative division for Komi-Permyaks, a branch of the Komis. The territory is now administrated as Komi-Permyak Okrug of Perm Krai.

History 
Komi-Permyak Autonomous Okrug was established on 26 February 1925, under the name of the Komi-Permyak National Okrug as a part of the former Ural Oblast. On 17 January 1934, the oblast was abolished and split into a number of regions, one of which was Sverdlovsk Oblast, which Komi-Permyak NO was subordinated to. On 3 October 1938, Perm Oblast was created and Komi-Permyak NO became subordinated to it. The region name was changed to end with "Autonomous Okrug" rather than "National Okrug" in 1977.

In 1992, the region became its own federal entity within the Russian Federation while simultaneously being administratively subordinated to Perm Oblast. In 2003, a merger referendum was held. The majority of residents who participated in the referendum in both Perm Oblast and Komi-Permyak Autonomous Okrug voted to merge the two regions into a single federal entity.

On 1 December 2005, Komi-Permyak Autonomous Okrug was merged into Perm Oblast to form the new region of Perm Krai. It became the first autonomous okrug in Russia to lose that status of the six which merged between 2005 and 2008.

References

Autonomous okrugs of Russia
Russian-speaking countries and territories
Former federal subjects of Russia